The term Danish Empire may refer to:

 The North Sea Empire of Cnut the Great (1016–1035)
 Danish control of Danish Estonia (1219–1346, 1559–1645)
 The Kalmar Union (1397–1523)
 Denmark–Norway (1524–1814)
 The Danish colonial empire in North America, the West Indies, the Gold Coast and India
 Danish Realm, sovereign state which consists of Denmark, the Faroe Islands and Greenland